We Got Communication is an EP by Australian indie rock band, Love Of Diagrams. It was recorded in July 2004 at ABC Studios, Southbank with J Walker and Leah Baker (of Triple J) producing. It was released on compact disc in October 2004 by Unstable Ape Records. This was their first release to have vocals; its five tracks included three new songs and two remixes of other tracks. Amazon.com editorial reviewer opined "the new vocal material certainly matches the high energy of their original instrumental work."

Two tracks from the EP were also released on a 7" vinyl single, "No Way Out", in the UK through The Passport Label, and the band played a handful of London shows in November 2005. "No Way Out" was used on an episode of The O.C. in season three, "The Game Plan" in December 2005.

Track listing

 "No Way Out" (4:05)
 "Waiting" (3:40)
 "In the Red" (3:34)
 "In the Red" (Mutant Tropicalismo rework by Qua) 3:30
 "No Way Out" (Dutch Boys remix by Cut Copy) 4:49

References 

2004 EPs